Salts Cave Archeological Site, near Munfordville, Kentucky, is a cave and archeological site which was listed on the National Register of Historic Places in 1979. The cave is part of Mammoth Cave National Park.

It has also been known as West's Cave and as Old Salts Cave.  It was listed for its information potential.

The listed area spans the borders of Hart County, Kentucky and Edmonson County, Kentucky.

References

Archaeological sites on the National Register of Historic Places in Kentucky
National Register of Historic Places in Hart County, Kentucky
National Register of Historic Places in Edmonson County, Kentucky
National Register of Historic Places in Mammoth Cave National Park
Caves of Kentucky